Jastrzębce may refer to the following places in Poland:
Jastrzębce, Lower Silesian Voivodeship (south-west Poland)
Jastrzębce, Pomeranian Voivodeship (north Poland)